Justin Smith is an Australian actor, best known for his AFI nominated performance as barrister 'Josh Bornstein' in the ABC mini-series Bastard Boys. He is also known in Australia for his TV, film, theatre and television commercial work.

Career
Smith's first professional role was at the age of 16 in the Australian tour of Jesus Christ Superstar starring John Farnham.

Smith played the role of Mark in the original Australian production of RENT, which garnered him a 1999 Green Room nomination for Best Actor in a musical, and starred in the movie Angst. Smith has also appeared in The Cherry Orchard and Ruby Moon for the Sydney Theatre Company and the productions, Shakespeare's R & J, Servant of Two Masters, and Just Macbeth (at the Sydney Opera House and Edinburgh Fringe Festival seasons), for the Bell Shakespeare Co. Aust.

In 2007 Smith was nominated for an AFI award for his role in Bastard Boys. In 2008, Smith played the role of Tony (Billy's older brother) in Billy Elliot the Musical, for which he was nominated for Best Actor in a Musical at the Sydney Theatre Awards 2008. In 2009, he was in The Sydney Theatre Company's successful production of Anthony Neilson's play, The Wonderful World of Dissocia.

In 2011, Smith appeared in Julia Leigh's Sleeping Beauty (official selection Cannes Film Festival); Jonathan Teplitzky's Burning Man; and the Fred Schepisi directed The Eye of the Storm. In 2012 Smith appeared as Muzz in Underbelly: Badness and, David Hill in Howzat! Kerry Packer's War. He toured Australia throughout 2012 and 2013 as 'Detective Sergeant Trotter' in the first professional Australian production of Agatha Christie's The Mousetrap.

In 2013, Smith performed in the Griffin Theatre Company's September 2013 production of John Romeril's "The Floating World" for which he won a Glugg Award for best supporting actor, and in early January 2014 in The Winter's Tale for Bell Shakespeare. He appeared in the Foxtel mini-series Devil's Playground in 2014 and Deadline Gallipoli in 2015 and Secret City in 2016.

Personal
Smith is married to Australian actress Sophie Gregg, and they have two children.

Smith's brother, Michael Howard Smith, made his London West End debut in the 2006 production of Andrew Lloyd Webber's Whistle Down the Wind in the role of 'Boon'. He also appeared at Edinburgh Festival in Seriously: Pet Shop Boys Reinterpreted.

Filmography

References

External links
 

Year of birth missing (living people)
Living people
Australian male stage actors
Australian male television actors
Australian male film actors
People educated at St Aloysius' College (Sydney)